Dave Stocking is one of the original members of Workers' Power, a group that was formed after  the Left Faction, was expelled from the International Socialists (now the Socialist Workers Party) for refusing to dissolve their faction in 1974.  
He is a leader of the international organisation, League for the Fifth International. He has written several articles on the Marxist understanding of the national question and the history of the Fourth International, as well as more recently on the anti-capitalist movement and the need for this to turn into a Fifth International.

References

Year of birth missing (living people)
Living people
League for the Fifth International
British Trotskyists